Dhal qazian is a town near Bagh, in Azad Kashmir, Pakistan. It is located approximately 6 km from Bagh at an altitude of 1700 m. Dhal qazian is divided into Upper and Lower Dhal. The town is led by a union council.

Populated places in Bagh District